Irtysh is a Russian Navy hospital ship of the Ob-class. Irtysh is part of the Pacific Fleet.

Development 
The four ships of the Ob-class hospital ships were designed to provide medical and recreational facilities. They were also employed as personnel transports. They have civilian crews but carry uniformed naval medical personnel. The ships are fully equipped with surgical equipment. Later two units are Project B-320 II, implying a modification to the basic design; the external differences are minor.

Construction and career
She was laid down on 25 November 1988 and launched on 6 July 1989 by Adolf Barsky shipyard. Commissioned on 31 July 1990 as a hospital ship.

In 2016, the modernization of the Irtysh's equipment began, the first phase of which was completed in August. She went under modernization again with telemedicine equipment in 2017.

The objectives of Irtysh now are receiving, distributing, providing medical assistance to the wounded, sick and injured in peacetime or during hostilities. Evacuation of victims from ships and vessels. Organization of events for the rest of crews of ships and submarines at sea.

Gallery

References

Ships built in Russia
1989 ships
Hospital ships of the Soviet Union and Russia
Hospital ships
Auxiliary ships of the Russian Navy
Ob-class hospital ships